Arnuwanda I was a king of the Hittite Empire. He became a ruler by marriage and was very religious. He ruled c. 1390–1380 BC (middle chronology).

Biography 
Arnuwanda became a king by marriage. His wife was Ašmu-nikal, daughter of king Tudhaliya I (also known as Tudhaliya I/II). He became a successor of Tudhaliya as his son-in-law. He began his reign under a co-regency with Tudhaliya.

During his time, the kingdom suffered what is known as the period of ‘concentric invasions’, when they were surrounded on all sides by enemies. A major enemy was the kingdom of Arzawa in the southwest. Arnuwanda may have led an unsuccessful expedition against Arzawa.

At the time, Arzawa was led by king Tarhuntaradu, who was corresponding with the Egyptian Pharaoh Amenhotep III. Tarhuntaradu was a powerful leader, and the Egyptians clearly saw Arzawa as capable of controlling that whole area.

Hattusa was sacked, and the court had to move to a temporary base, probably at Samuha. But later, under Suppiluliuma I, many of those losses were reversed.

According to Kuhrt (2020), Tudhaliya III was the  successor of Arnuwanda I. Since several scholars refer to him also as Tudhaliya II, he can also be described as Tudhaliya II/III. Further, Suppiluliuma I was the son and eventual heir of Tudhaliya II/III.

Family 
Arnuwanda's parents are not known. He was a son-in-law of Tudhaliya and Nikal-mati. He had two sons, prince Ašmi-Šarruma and king Tudhaliya II (or II/III). There is a very fragmentary text in which Arnuwanda names his son Tudhaliya as his future successor.

Gallery

See also

 History of the Hittites
 Madduwatta

References

External links
Reign of Arnuwanda I

Hittite kings
14th-century BC rulers